The Russian Symphony Concerts were a series of Russian classical music concerts hosted by timber magnate and musical philanthropist Mitrofan Belyayev in St. Petersburg as a forum for young Russian composers to have their orchestral works performed. While a number of works by these composers were performed, pieces written by composers of the previous generation such as Nikolai Rimsky-Korsakov and Mily Balakirev were also played there.

History
The idea for the Russian Symphony Concerts was Rimsky-Korsakov's. He had become acquainted with Belyayev at the weekly "quartet Fridays" ("Les Vendredis") held at Belayev's home. Belayev had already taken a keen interest in the musical future of the teenage Alexander Glazunov, who had been one of Rimsky-Korsakov's composition students. In 1884, Belayev rented out a hall and hired an orchestra to play Glazunov's First Symphony plus an orchestral suite Glazunov had just composed. Glazunov was to conduct part of this concert. Seeing he was not ready to do this, Rimsky-Korsakov volunteered to take his place. This "rehearsal," as Rimsky-Korsakov called it, went well and pleased both Belayev and the invited audience. Buoyed by the success of the rehearsal, Belayev decided the following season to give a public concert of works by Glazunov and other composers. Rimsky-Korsakov's piano concerto was played, along with Glazunov's symphonic poem Stenka Razin.

Both the rehearsal the previous year and this concert gave Rimsky-Korsakov the idea of offering several concerts per year featuring Russian compositions. The number of orchestral compositions was growing, and there were always difficulties in having the Russian Musical Society and other organizations program them. Rimsky-Korsakov mentioned the idea to Belayev. Belayev liked it, inaugurating the Russian Symphony Concerts during the 1886-1887 season. Rimsky-Korsakov shared conducting duties for these concerts.

In 1889 Belyayev engaged Rimsky-Korsakov to conduct two such concerts at the Paris Exposition. Rimsky-Korsakov recalled that although the performances, held at the Trocadéro on 22 and 29 June involving the Concerts Colonne orchestra, had gone well, the audiences had been meagre due to Belyayev's reluctance to advertise the concerts. Nonetheless, the programmes of works by Glinka, Glazunov, Tchaikovsky and Lyadov, as well as works by "the mighty handful" made a profound impression on Maurice Ravel and Ricardo Viñes, who made a point of obtaining a piano duet arrangement of Rimsky-Korsakov's Antar Symphony. So started what was to be an important influence on Ravel's own work.

Glazunov was appointed conductor for the series in 1896. The following year, he led the disastrous premiere of Rachmaninoff's Symphony No 1. While Glazunov's conducting skills were not especially strong and he used his rehearsal time poorly, his alcoholism may have contributed to the debacle.

Works premiered
Some of the works currently best known as "Russian music" were first presented at the Russian Symphony Concerts. Rimsky-Korsakov finished his revision of Modest Mussorgsky's Night on Bald Mountain and conducted it at the opening concert. He also wrote Scheherazade, Capriccio espagnol and the Russian Easter Festival Overture specifically for them. Revisions of earlier works were also featured. One concert included the first complete performance of the final version of Pyotr Ilyich Tchaikovsky's First Symphony; another featured the premiere of the revised version of Rimsky-Korsakov's Third Symphony. Sergei Rachmaninoff's tone poem The Rock was premiered at a Russian Symphony Concert in 1896 under the direction of Glazunov; this was followed a year later by the premiere of Rachmaninoff's First Symphony, also under Glazunov.

References

Bibliography
Brown, David, Tchaikovsky: The Final Years, 1885–1893 (New York: W.W. Norton & Company, 1991). .
Figes, Orlando, Natasha's Dance: A Cultural History of Russia (New York: Metropolitan Books, 2002).  (hc.)
Harrison, Max, Rachmaninoff: Life, Works, Recordings (London and New York: Continuum, 2005). .
Maes, Francis, tr. Pomerans, Arnold J. and Erica Pomerans, A History of Russian Music: From Kamarinskaya to Babi Yar (Berkeley, Los Angeles and London: University of California Press, 2002). .
Nichols, Roger, Ravel (New Haven: Yale University Press, 2011). .
Rimsky-Korsakov, Nikolai, Letoppis Moyey Muzykalnoy Zhizni (St. Petersburg, 1909), published in English as My Musical Life (New York: Knopf, 1925, 3rd ed. 1942; reprinted London: Faber & Faber, 1989. ).
Volkov, Solomon, tr. Antonina W. Bouis, St. Petersburg: A Cultural History (New York: The Free Press, 1995). .

Classical music in Russia
Music organizations based in Russia